The US Military Communications-Electronics Board (abbreviated MCEB or USMCEB) is an element of the United States Department of Defense, which is responsive to both the US Secretary of Defense and the Joint Chiefs of Staff. One of its roles is to develop Allied Communications Publications, which are then submitted to the Combined Communications-Electronics Board for approval.

See also

 United States Army Communications-Electronics Command

References

United States Department of Defense
Military communications of the United States